Guelma Belkheir Airport was a public use airport located near Guelma, Guelma, Algeria. Google Earth Historical Imagery shows the  asphalt runway deteriorated and unusable, with junk, storage sheds, and vegetation.

See also

Transport in Algeria
List of airports in Algeria

References

External links 
 

Airports in Algeria
Defunct airports
Buildings and structures in Guelma Province